The R38 was a New York City Subway car model built by the St. Louis Car Company from 1966 to 1967 for the IND/BMT B Division. Two hundred were built in married pairs. The R38s were built to supply extra trains for service changes resulting from the 1967 opening of the Chrystie Street Connection. The R38 was the second subway car order to be built with stainless steel exteriors, and the first subway car fleet to have air conditioning installed.

The first R38s entered service on August 23, 1966. In 1987–1988, all R38s were rebuilt by General Electric, and the original rollsigns and express/local marker lights at the end of each car were replaced with flipdot signs. The R160 order replaced the entire fleet of R38s, the last of which ran on March 18, 2009. After retirement, all cars but one pair, which is preserved by the New York Transit Museum, were stripped and sunken as artificial reefs.

Description
The R38s were numbered 3950–4149. The cars were arranged in "married pairs" of two cars semi-permanently coupled together by a drawbar. Even-numbered cars were known as "B" cars, while odd-numbered cars were known as "A" cars.

The R38 was the second subway car order to be built with stainless steel exteriors, the first being the R32 order in 1964. The cars were built with aluminium roofs, vandal-proof fiberglass seats, and with indirect fluorescent lighting, which also provided illumination of the advertisement cards as well, a similar setup to the last 150 R32 cars delivered in 1965 numbered 3800–3949.

The R38 was the first successful subway car fleet to have air conditioning installed after earlier prototypes failed on older subway cars. The last ten cars delivered (4140–4149) came factory equipped with Stone-Safety 10-ton split system air conditioning system featuring the compressor/condenser units mounted under the cars, while the evaporator units were installed on the top interior ends of the car in 1967. The first six air conditioned cars came into service on the F train on July 19, 1967. The six-week experiment was a success after past failures, and air conditioning would soon, but not immediately, become standard equipment on new rolling stock built for the system, since the first 200 R40 cars were built without air conditioning. The air conditioned cars cost $40,000 more than the non-air conditioned cars. From this point on, the New York City Transit Authority began adopting air conditioning as standard equipment on all new cars, and older model cars were retrofitted with AC units to make life much more bearable throughout the subway system. The Stone-Safety Air Conditioning system was adopted from their standard railroad and commuter coach air conditioning systems, and it proved very successful.

History 
In March 1965, the New York City Transit Authority, continuing its program of car replacement, ordered 200 additional cars for the B Division from the St. Louis Car Company. These cars were the first to replace cars for the IND since it started operation in 1932. They also supplied extra trains for the Chrystie Street Connection, which opened on November 27, 1967. St. Louis was chosen after the first three bids were deemed as too high, with the cost savings totalling $500,000.

Overhaul and mishaps
Cars 3990–3991 & 4000–4001 were involved in an incident on June 11, 1972, at the bumper blocks within the relay area east of the Jamaica–179 Street Terminal. These cars were stored in very heavily damaged condition at Coney Island Yard until they were scrapped in 1983.

In 1987–1988, the 196 remaining R38s were rebuilt by General Electric at its Buffalo, New York facility. During the rebuilding process, the R38s were fully equipped with air conditioning systems. Prior to rebuilding, the R38s featured mylar curtain route signs on their bulkheads displaying the service bullet and destination, similar to past B-Division R-type cars. After rebuilding, they received Luminator flipdot signs that displayed the service letter only, since the air conditioning evaporators mounted on the interior car ends made it rather difficult to change the front route and destination rollsigns. The distinctive "EXP" (express) and "LOCAL" marker lights were also removed. Like the R32s, the rollsigns on the sides of the cars were updated and retained.

The first ten R38s were sent to General Electric in early January 1987, along with ten R32s. The last unrebuilt train of R38s made its last trip on the  before being sent out to be rebuilt on July 11, 1988. By December 28, 1988 all rebuilt R38s were in service.

Retirement
The R160 order replaced the entire fleet of R38s. After retirement, all cars except for 4028–4029 were stripped and sunken as artificial reefs.

Cars 4028–4029 are preserved by the New York Transit Museum. They were restored to operating status in 2013–2014 and have been operating on New York City Transit Museum-sponsored excursions since August 3, 2014, specifically on the Train of Many Metals (TOMM).

In popular culture

Movies
 The subway scene in a 2002 movie Men in Black II, features an alien entering a tunnel. Once there, it attacks and devours most of a subway train (which is a combination of R32 and R38 cars) until Agent J destroys it.

Video Games
 The trains in the video game Grand Theft Auto IV are based on the R38s.

References

Further reading
 Sansone, Gene. Evolution of New York City subways: An illustrated history of New York City's transit cars, 1867–1997. New York Transit Museum Press, New York, 1997

External links

nycsubway.org - NYC Subway Cars: R38
Car Status/Assignment

Train-related introductions in 1966
St. Louis multiple units
New York City Subway rolling stock